David Moyes (born 14 October 1955) is a Scottish former professional footballer who played as a defender. He started his career at Preston Athletic before signing for Berwick Rangers in 1975. He stayed at Berwick for 8 years and was a key member of the squad which won the Second division title in 1979. He moved to Meadowbank Thistle in 1983 and Dunfermline Athletic in 1985 before returning to Berwick in 1987. He retired in 1988 after making over 300 appearances in the Scottish Football League including 253 appearances for Berwick.

References

External links

1955 births
Living people
Scottish footballers
Berwick Rangers F.C. players
Livingston F.C. players
Dunfermline Athletic F.C. players
Scottish Football League players
Preston Athletic F.C. players
Association football defenders